Timothy Mather Spelman (January 21, 1891 – August 21, 1970) was an American composer.

Spelman was a native of Brooklyn, and studied in New York with Harry Rowe Shelley in 1908; further study came with Albert Spalding and Edward Burlingame Hill at Harvard University from 1909 until 1913, and from 1913 to 1915 with Walter Courvoisier at the University of Music and Performing Arts Munich. In the latter year, returning to the United States, Spelman took up a post as assistant director of training for band musicians under the United States Department of War. In 1918 he and his wife, the poet Leolyn Louise Everett, returned to Europe and settled in Florence; except for the years between 1935 and 1947, during which the couple returned to the United States, he spent the rest of his life resident in Italy.

Spelman's music is reminiscent more of Impressionism and European Romanticism, and typically received more performances in Europe than in his native country. Many of his works, including three operas and a large number of songs, were composed to texts by his wife; another notable work is his setting of the Pervigilium Veneris.

Spelman's manuscripts are held at the Peabody Institute Library of Johns Hopkins University, as is a collection of other family papers. The couple's villa in Florence was also bequeathed to the university, where it was dedicated as the Charles S. Singleton Center for Italian Studies, sometimes known as Villa Spelman.

Compositions
 Christ and the Blind Man, symphonic poem for orchestra
 Barbaresques, suite for orchestra
 Saints' Days, for orchestra (1925)
 The Sea-Rovers, opera (1928)
 Miles Standish, opera
 Symphony for orchestra
 Concerto for oboe and orchestra
 Piano sonata
 String quartet
 Litany of the Middle Ages, cantata
 Pervigilium Veneris, for chorus
Taken from

See also
Biography at the Johns Hopkins Library website

References

1891 births
1970 deaths
American male composers
20th-century American composers
20th-century American male musicians
University of Music and Performing Arts Munich alumni
Harvard University alumni
Musicians from Brooklyn
Classical musicians from New York (state)
American expatriates in Italy